Henry Lewis Merchant (February 17, 1918 – August 23, 1982), nicknamed "Speed", was an American Negro league outfielder in the 1940s and 1950s.

A native of Birmingham, Alabama, Merchant made his Negro leagues debut in 1940 for the Chicago American Giants. He spent many years with the Cincinnati/Indianapolis Clowns, and was selected to represent Indianapolis in the East–West All-Star Game in 1950 and 1952. Merchant died in Cincinnati, Ohio in 1982 at age 64.

References

External links
 and Seamheads

1918 births
1982 deaths
Chicago American Giants players
Cincinnati Clowns players
Indianapolis Clowns players
Baseball outfielders
Baseball players from Birmingham, Alabama
20th-century African-American sportspeople